Clyde is an unincorporated community in Phelps County, Nebraska, United States.

References

Unincorporated communities in Phelps County, Nebraska
Unincorporated communities in Nebraska